Diplomatic relations between Azerbaijan and Kyrgyzstan were established on January 19, 1993.

Over 20,000 Azerbaijanis live in Kyrgyzstan and actively participate as entrepreneurs and in the social life of the country. The main settlements of Azerbaijanis are Talas, Bishkek, and Kara-Balta. On May 16, 2007, the Embassy of Azerbaijan was opened in Kyrgyzstan.

The cultures of Azerbaijan and Kyrgyzstan have similar roots in terms of religion, traditions and language.

Diplomatic relations
The first meeting of independent Azerbaijan and Kyrgyzstan presidents occurred in first Commonwealth of Independent States (CIS) Head of state council in 1993.

On November 11, 1996, foreign ministers of Azerbaijan and Kyrgyzstan signed a cooperation protocol.

The first visit of Kyrgyzstan president to Azerbaijan occurred in 1997 where 14 agreements were signed, where the most notable were Friendship Agreement between republics and cooperation of Justice Ministries from both sides. Moreover, the working group which specializes in interparliamentary relations was created.

In addition, president of Kyrgyzstan Askar Akayev visited the conference in Baku where the restoration of the Silk Road as part of TRACECA was being actively discussed. Furthermore, a multilateral European-Caucasus-Asia corridor cooperation agreement was signed.

In 2004, bilateral military sphere cooperation pact was signed between Ministries of Defense.

On October 3, 2009, Kyrgyzstan President Kurmanbek Bakiyev visited Nakhchivan for a summit of heads of Turkic speaking countries. At this meeting, the Turkic Council was founded.

On March 30–31, 2012, President of Kyrgyzstan paid a working visit to Azerbaijan.

See also 
 Azerbaijanis in Kyrgyzstan
 Foreign relations of Azerbaijan
 Foreign relations of Kyrgyzstan

References 

Azerbaijan
Kyrgyzstan